Trifon Korobeynikov (died after 1594) was a 16th-century Moscow merchant and traveller.

Korobeynikov made two visits to Palestine, Mount Athos and İstanbul, in 1582-84 and 1594-94 on assignments of tsars Ivan IV and Feodor I. 
Also in 1594, he also co-authored a Moscow government report on financial affairs.

His travel account was re-published in 1783, under the title of  "The Travels of a Moscow Merchant, Trifon Korobeynikov, and His Comrades to Jerusalem, Egypt, and Mount Sinai in 1583" and was frequently reprinted (Saint Petersburg:  1786, 1803, 1810, 1834, 1837, 1838, 1841, 1846, 1847, Moscow  1851, 1852, 1853, 1854, 1859, 1866, 1869, 1870, 1871, 1873, 1874, 1875, 1876, 1878, 1879, 1881, 1882, 1886, 1888).

References
O. A. Belobrova,  in:  D. S. Likhachev, ;  Nauka, 1988.

16th-century births
Year of death unknown
Russian merchants
Russian explorers
Russian travel writers
16th-century Russian businesspeople